The Cis-Sutlej states were a group of states in the modern Punjab and Haryana states of north India during the 19th century, lying between the Sutlej River on the north, the Himalayas on the east, the Yamuna River and Delhi District on the south, and Sirsa District on the west.

History
Ranjit Singh led three expeditions into Cis-Sutlej states in 1806, 1807 and 1808, seizing many territories, particularly 45 district subdivisions or administrative units (parganas) and then distributed them among different chiefs who would pay annual tributes of certain amount as recognition of Ranjit Singh's supremacy. Ranjit Singh gave some territories of Cis-Sutlej to his mother in law Rani Sada Kaur and granted a good deal of villages to his general Dewan Mokham Chand. In all 45 paraganas, Ranjit Singh assigned salaried agents to different territories who sustained some soldiers for internal administration to retrieve revenues from lands. Some of the important vassal territories of Sikh empire were, Anandpur, Rupar, Himmatpur, Wadni, Harikepatan, Firozpur and Mamdot. An 1809 agreement with Ranjit Singh, emperor of the Sikh Empire west of the Sutlej, brought the states under the aegis of Ranjit Singh's Sikh Empire's dominion. The Cis-Sutlej states included Kaithal, Patiala, Jind, Thanesar, Maler Kotla and Faridkot. Before 1846 the greater part of this territory was relatively independent, the chiefs being subject to supervision from a political officer stationed at Umballa, and styled the agent of the British Governor-General of India for the Cis-Sutlej states.
 
A number of states were confiscated or acquired by Britain under the Doctrine of Lapse. After the First Anglo-Sikh War the full administration of the territory became vested in this officer.
 
Punjab was annexed in 1849 to British India, when the Cis-Sutlej states commissionership, comprising the districts of Ambala, Ferozepore, Ludhiana, Thanesar and Simla, was incorporated with the new Punjab Province.
 
The name continued to be applied to this division until 1862, when—owing to Ferozepore having been transferred to Lahore Division and a part of Thanesar to Delhi Division—it ceased to be appropriate. The remaining tract became known as the Ambala Division. The princely states of Patiala, Jind, and Nabha were appointed a separate political agency in 1901. Excluding Bahawalpur (for which there was no political agent) and Chamba, the other states were grouped under the commissioners of Jullunder and Delhi, and the superintendent of the Simla Hill States. All native states, except Kaithal, would join PEPSU after India's independence.

Districts and states

Present districts and divisions
The Union territory of Chandigarh
Patiala District
Mohali District
Mansa District
Barnala District
Sangrur District
Jalandhar District
Muktsar District
Hoshiarpur District
Bathinda District
Ludhiana District
Firozpur District 
Panchkula District
Jind District
Ambala District
Fazilka District
Faridkot District
Moga District
Fatehgarh Sahib District
Rupnagar District
Yamunanagar District

Present 14 districts of East Punjab, Chandigarh and present 4 districts of Haryana were there in Cis Sutlej States.

Rest of the Bist Doab including districts of Hoshiarpur, Kapurthala, SBS Nagar and Jalandhar were merged and made a new Trans Sutlej States in 1846 after First Anglo Sikh War.

Princely states
Patiala
Jind
Nabha
Faridkot
Maler Kotla
Kalsia

See also
Maratha Empire
Maratha conquest of North-west India
Second Anglo-Maratha War
Sikh Empire

 Phulkian sardars
 Patiala State
 Nabha State
 Jind State
 Faridkot State
 Malaudh
 Bhadaur
 Kaithal

References

Historical Indian regions
History of Haryana
History of Punjab
1809 establishments in India
Maratha Empire